Ebrahim Fathi oregani  (born September 21, 1982) is an Iranian wushu athlete.
 Ebrahim Fathi with his two teammates of Iran Duilian group, Mohsen Ahmadi and Navid Makvandi, have attended several world championship events and introduced Iran as the first contender of this sub-division in Wushu world.

Career 
Ebrahim Fathi started his wushu career at the age of 12. he has won numerous titles of the Duilian in World and Asian Championships including Macau, Canada, Turkey, Indonesia and Malaysia. he was a member of Iran national wushu team that won Asian gold medal at the Asian Championship in Macau for the first time in the history of Iran Taolu Wushu.

References

External links 
 Ebrahim Fathi on WUSHU FEDERATION OF I.R.IRAN
 International Wushu Federation
 Esfahan wushu Assosation
 Ebrahim Fathi on Aparat
 Ebrahim fathi oregani on Instagram

Living people
Iranian wushu practitioners
Iranian sanshou practitioners
1982 births
People from Najafabad
Islamic Solidarity Games competitors for Iran